Banda Vasudev Rao  was an Indian agriculturalist and poultry farmer, considered by many as the father of poultry farming in India. He was the founder chairman of the National Egg Coordination Committee (NECC) and was a 2004 inductee of the International Poultry Hall of Fame of the World Poultry Science Association. The Government of India awarded him the fourth highest civilian award of Padma Shri in 1990.When he died, the combined fortune of his family was $325 million(1300 crore).His company directly employed around 5000 employees by 1996.

Early and personal life
B. V. Rao was born on 6 November 1935 at Chanchalguda, in Hyderabad, in the undivided south Indian state of Andhra Pradesh (presently in Telangana).

Career

After working in many capacities such as a telephone operator, railway police staff and as a personal secretary to a state minister, Rao enrolled for a short-length course at Acharya N. G. Ranga Agricultural University, Rajendranagar. He did this in order to see what he could make of his life as an independent farmer, so that he may not need to work at the low-level jobs in which he was stuck due to not having an education. He successfully complete a training program in dairy and poultry farming where he had the opportunity to learn under an American teacher, Moore. His first business venture was with 500 birds entrusted by Moore for tending and, soon, Rao started his own venture in a 7-acre plot, for which the funds were raised by selling his wife's jewelry. The business, started in 1970, grew over the years to the present V H Group, a 2 billion conglomerate with interests in poultry, meat, pharmaceuticals, cattle feed, sports and has presence in India, Bangladesh, United Kingdom, Singapore, Vietnam and Brazil. They hold a 99.9 percent stake in the EFL Championship team, Blackburn Rovers F.C., since 2010.

When the price of eggs went down in the early 1980s, Rao gathered farmers together and founded the National Egg Coordination Committee in 1982 and was its founder chairman. He was also associated with the World Poultry Science Association (WPSA) and headed its India chapter from 1993 to 1996. He was one of the key figures in the organization of the World Poultry Conference in New Delhi in 1996. He also founded a higher education institution, Dr B.V. Rao Institute of Poultry Management and Technology, which conducts higher courses in the subject. The Government of India awarded him the civilian honour of the Padma Shri in 1990. The World Poultry Science Association inducted him into their Hall of Fame in 2004 but he died before the investiture ceremony could take place.

See also

 National Egg Coordination Committee
 V H Group

References

Recipients of the Padma Shri in trade and industry
1935 births
2004 deaths
People from Hyderabad district, India
Businesspeople from Hyderabad, India
Indian farmers
Indian agriculturalists
Indian industrialists
Poultry industry in India